Silai Elupatu is a Tamil-language work by the poet Kambar. It was written to describe people's way of life in ancient Tamilakam. It includes reference to various gotras.

References

Tamil-language literature